Phyllonorycter cavella is a moth of the family Gracillariidae. It is known from all of Europe (except Ireland, the Iberian Peninsula, the Balkan Peninsula and the Mediterranean islands), east to Japan and Russia.

The wingspan is 6–9 mm.

The larvae feed on Betula pendula and Betula pubescens. They mine the leaves of their host plant. They create a relatively large, lower-surface tentiform mine. The epidermis is strongly folded. Pupation takes place within the mine in a white cocoon.

External links
bladmineerders.nl 
Fauna Europaea

cavella
Moths of Europe
Moths of Asia
Moths described in 1846